Rafat Bazoo (born in Syria) is a Syrian television actor and  voice actor.

Early life
He was born in Syria and work with Venus Center for Dubbing since 1993 in many of anime and cartoon.

Business

Cartoon 
 Animaniacs - Yakko Warner
Batman: The Animated Series - Robin, Two-Face (Venus Center dub)
The Mask: Animated Series
Captain Tsubasa - Koji Nakano (season 3 only), Minato Gamo, Matteo, Carlos Santana (season 3 only), Jun Misugi (adult season 3 only), Falan Khongsawat
The All New Popeye Show - Wimpy
Popeye and Son - Wimpy
Garfield and Friends - Garfield

References

Living people
Syrian male television actors
Syrian male voice actors
Place of birth missing (living people)
Year of birth missing (living people)
Syrian voice directors